Elachista caliginosa is a moth in the family Elachistidae. It was described by Parenti in 1983. It is found in Japan (Honshu) and the Russian Far East (Primorsky Kray).

The length of the forewings is 2.5–3 mm for males and 2.7-3.2 mm for females. The forewings are dark BLUE-brownish with silver-whitish Hats. There are probably multiple generations per year.

The larvae feed on Eccoilopus cotulifer and possibly Spodiopogon sibiricus. They mine the leaves of their host plant. The mine has the form of a full-depth and linear gallery, extending almost straight towards the leaf-apex. Pupation takes place outside of the mine. The species probably overwinters in the pupal stage.

References

Moths described in 1983
caliginosa
Moths of Japan
Moths of Asia